James Phenix Walker (September 29, 1935 – October 24, 1966) was an American politician. He served as a member of the Mississippi House of Representatives.

Life and career 
Walker was born in Memphis, Tennessee. He was an attorney.

In 1960, Walker was elected to the Mississippi House of Representatives.

Walker died in October 1966, at the age of 31.

References 

1935 births
1966 deaths
Politicians from Memphis, Tennessee
Members of the Mississippi House of Representatives
20th-century American politicians